Tarrah-e Yek (also Romanized as Ţarrāḩ-e Yek; also known as Ţarāh, Ţarrāḩ, Ţarrāh-e Seyyed ‘Alī, and Ţarraḩ Seyyed ‘Alī) is a village in Tarrah Rural District, Hamidiyeh District, Ahvaz County, Khuzestan Province, Iran. At the 2006 census, its population was 1,370, in 189 families.

References 

Populated places in Ahvaz County